Ridge Racer 64 is a racing video game developed by Nintendo Software Technology for the Nintendo 64 in 2000. It features a total of 20 race tracks, including some drawn from Ridge Racer and Ridge Racer Revolution.

In 2004, the game was remade for the Nintendo DS as Ridge Racer DS, which uses the system's built-in features such as the touch-screen and wireless multi-player while providing otherwise a very similar experience to its original counterpart.

Reception

The N64 version received "favorable" reviews, while the DS remake received "mixed" reviews, according to the review aggregation website Metacritic. Michael Wolf of NextGen gave a positive review for N64 version.

References

External links
 
 

2000 video games
Multiplayer and single-player video games
Namco games
Nintendo games
Nintendo 64 games
Nintendo DS games
Nintendo Software Technology games
Racing video games
Ridge Racer
Video games developed in the United States